Acarolella gentilis is a species of tortrix moth in the tortricine tribe Cochylini. The species was first described in 1994 by Józef Razowski. The type specimen was collected in Bolivia.

Appearance
Acarolella gentilis has a wingspan of 17 mm.

References

Cochylini
Moths described in 1994
Taxa named by Józef Razowski
Fauna of Bolivia
Moths of South America